Virginia has sent senators to the U.S. Senate since 1789.  Its Senate seats were declared vacant in March 1861, due to its secession from the Union, but senators representing its western counties continued to sit until March 1865. Virginia's Senate seats were again filled from January 1870. Virginia's current senators are Democrats Mark Warner and Tim Kaine. Harry F. Byrd was Virginia's longest-serving senator (1933–1965).

List of senators

|- style="height:2em"
! 1
| align=left | William Grayson
|  | Anti-Admin.
| nowrap | Mar 4, 1789 –Mar 12, 1790
| Elected in 1788.Died.
| rowspan=4 | 1
| rowspan=4 
| rowspan=7 | 1
| rowspan=5 | Elected in 1788.Resigned.
| rowspan=5 nowrap | Mar 4, 1789 –Oct 8, 1792
| rowspan=5  | Anti-Admin.
| rowspan=5 align=right | Richard H. Lee
! rowspan=5 | 1

|- style="height:2em"
| colspan=3 | Vacant
| nowrap | Mar 12, 1790 –Mar 31, 1790
|
|- style="height:2em"
! 2
| align=left | John Walker
|  | Pro-Admin.
| nowrap | Mar 31, 1790 –Nov 9, 1790
| Appointed to continue Grayson's term.Retired.

|- style="height:2em"
! rowspan=5 | 3
| rowspan=5 align=left | James Monroe
| rowspan=5  | Anti-Admin.
| rowspan=5 nowrap | Nov 9, 1790 –May 27, 1794
| Elected to finish Grayson's term.

|- style="height:2em"
| rowspan=4 | Re-elected in 1791.Resigned to become U.S. Minister Plenipotentiary to France.
| rowspan=9 | 2
| rowspan=3 

|- style="height:2em"
| 
| nowrap | Oct 8, 1792 –Oct 18, 1792
| colspan=3 | Vacant

|- style="height:2em"
| Elected to finish Lee's term.
| rowspan=3 nowrap | Oct 18, 1792 –May 11, 1794
| rowspan=3  | Anti-Admin.
| rowspan=3 align=right | John Taylor
! rowspan=3 | 2

|- style="height:2em"
| rowspan=5 
| rowspan=8 | 2
| rowspan=2 | Re-elected in 1793.Resigned.

|- style="height:2em"
| rowspan=2 colspan=3 | Vacant
| rowspan=2 nowrap | May 27, 1794 –Nov 18, 1794
| rowspan=2 |

|- style="height:2em"
| rowspan=2 |
| rowspan=2 nowrap | May 11, 1794 –Dec 29, 1794
| rowspan=2 colspan=3 | Vacant

|- style="height:2em"
! rowspan=9 | 4
| rowspan=9 align=left | Stevens T. Mason
| rowspan=2  | Anti-Admin.
| rowspan=9 nowrap | Nov 18, 1794 –May 10, 1803
| rowspan=3 | Elected to finish Monroe's term.

|- style="height:2em"
| rowspan=3 | Elected to finish Taylor's term.Re-elected in 1798, but died before new term began.
| rowspan=3 nowrap | Dec 29, 1794 –Jan 24, 1799
|  | Anti-Admin.
| rowspan=3 align=right | Henry Tazewell
! rowspan=3 | 3

|- style="height:2em"
| rowspan=7  | Democratic-Republican
| 
| rowspan=2  | Democratic-Republican

|- style="height:2em"
| rowspan=5 | Re-elected in 1796.
| rowspan=5 | 3
| rowspan=2 

|- style="height:2em"
| rowspan=2 | 
| rowspan=2 nowrap | Jan 24, 1799 –Dec 5, 1799
| rowspan=2 colspan=3 | Vacant

|- style="height:2em"
| rowspan=2 
| rowspan=11 | 3

|- style="height:2em"
| rowspan=6 | Elected to finish Tazewell's term.Resigned to become collector of the port of Norfolk.
| rowspan=6 nowrap | Dec 5, 1799 –May 22, 1804
| rowspan=6  | Democratic-Republican
| rowspan=6 align=right | Wilson C. Nicholas
! rowspan=6 | 4

|- style="height:2em"
| 

|- style="height:2em"
| Re-elected in 1803.Died.
| rowspan=10 | 4
| rowspan=8 

|- style="height:2em"
| colspan=3 | Vacant
| nowrap | May 10, 1803 –Jun 4, 1803
|
|- style="height:2em"
! 5
| align=left | John Taylor
|  | Democratic-Republican
| nowrap | Jun 4, 1803 –Dec 7, 1803
| Appointed to continue Mason's term.Retired.

|- style="height:2em"
! rowspan=2 | 6
| rowspan=2 align=left | Abraham B. Venable
| rowspan=2  | Democratic-Republican
| rowspan=2 nowrap | Dec 7, 1803 –Jun 7, 1804
| rowspan=2 | Elected to finish Mason's term.Resigned to become President of the Bank of Virginia.

|- style="height:2em"
| rowspan=2 | 
| rowspan=2 nowrap | May 22, 1804 –Aug 11, 1804
| rowspan=2 colspan=3 | Vacant

|- style="height:2em"
| colspan=3 | Vacant
| nowrap | Jun 7, 1804 –Aug 11, 1804
|
|- style="height:2em"
! 7
| align=left | William B. Giles
|  | Democratic-Republican
| nowrap | Aug 11, 1804 –Dec 3, 1804
| Appointed to continue Venable's term.Resigned when elected to finish Wilson Cary Nicholas's Class 2 term.
| Appointed to continue Nicholas's term.Resigned when elected to finish Abraham B. Venable's Class 1 term.
| nowrap | Aug 11, 1804 –Dec 3, 1804
|  | Democratic-Republican
| align=right | Andrew Moore
! 5

|- style="height:2em"
! rowspan=3 | 8
| rowspan=3 align=left | Andrew Moore
| rowspan=3  | Democratic-Republican
| rowspan=3 nowrap | Dec 4, 1804 –Mar 3, 1809
| rowspan=3 | Elected to finish Venable's term.Retired.
| Elected to finish Nicholas's term.
| rowspan=8 nowrap | Dec 4, 1804 –Mar 3, 1815
| rowspan=8  | Democratic-Republican
| rowspan=8 align=right | William B. Giles
! rowspan=8 | 6

|- style="height:2em"
| 
| rowspan=3 | 4
| rowspan=3 | Re-elected in 1804.

|- style="height:2em"
| 

|- style="height:2em"
! rowspan=3 | 9
| rowspan=3 align=left | Richard Brent
| rowspan=3  | Democratic-Republican
| rowspan=3 nowrap | Mar 4, 1809 –Dec 30, 1814
| rowspan=3 | Elected in 1809.Died.
| rowspan=5 | 5
| 

|- style="height:2em"
| 
| rowspan=6 | 5
| rowspan=4 | Re-elected in 1811.Resigned.

|- style="height:2em"
| rowspan=3 

|- style="height:2em"
| colspan=3 | Vacant
| nowrap | Dec 30, 1814 –Jan 2, 1815
|
|- style="height:2em"
! rowspan=14 | 10
| rowspan=14 align=left | James Barbour
| rowspan=13  | Democratic-Republican
| rowspan=14 nowrap | Jan 2, 1815 –Mar 7, 1825
| Elected to finish Brent's term, having already been elected to the next term.

|- style="height:2em"
| rowspan=6 | Elected in 1814.
| rowspan=6 | 6
| rowspan=2 
| John Eppes (DR) was elected in 1815, but declined to serve.
| nowrap | Mar 4, 1815 –Jan 3, 1816
| colspan=3 | Vacant

|- style="height:2em"
| Elected to finish Giles's term.Lost re-election.
| nowrap | Jan 3, 1816 –Mar 3, 1817
|  | Democratic-Republican
| align=right | Armistead T. Mason
! 7
|- style="height:2em"
| 
| rowspan=7 | 6
| rowspan=2 | Elected in 1816.Resigned because of ill health.
| rowspan=2 nowrap | Mar 4, 1817 –Dec 4, 1819
| rowspan=2  | Democratic-Republican
| rowspan=2 align=right | John Eppes
! rowspan=2 | 8

|- style="height:2em"
| rowspan=3 

|- style="height:2em"
| 
| nowrap | Dec 4, 1819 –Dec 14, 1819
| colspan=3 | Vacant

|- style="height:2em"
| rowspan=2 | Elected in 1819 to finish Eppes's term.Resigned.
| rowspan=2 nowrap | Dec 14, 1819 –Dec 15, 1822
| rowspan=2  | Democratic-Republican
| rowspan=2 align=right | James Pleasants
! rowspan=2 | 9

|- style="height:2em"
| rowspan=7 | Re-elected in 1821.Resigned to become U.S. Secretary of War.
| rowspan=9 | 7
| rowspan=3 

|- style="height:2em"
| 
| nowrap | Dec 15, 1822 –Dec 18, 1822
| colspan=3 | Vacant

|- style="height:2em"
| Elected to finish Pleasants' term.
| rowspan=2 nowrap | Dec 18, 1822 –Aug 21, 1824
| rowspan=2  | Democratic-Republican
| rowspan=2 align=right | John Taylor
! rowspan=2 | 10

|- style="height:2em"
| rowspan=3 
| rowspan=7 | 7
| Re-elected in 1823.Died.

|- style="height:2em"
| 
| nowrap | Aug 21, 1824 –Dec 7, 1824
| colspan=3 | Vacant

|- style="height:2em"
| rowspan=5 | Elected to finish Taylor's term.
| rowspan=7 nowrap | Dec 7, 1824 –Jul 16, 1832
|  | Democratic–Republican
| rowspan=7 align=right | Littleton Tazewell
! rowspan=7 | 11

|- style="height:2em"
|  | Jacksonian
| rowspan=3 
| rowspan=6  | Jacksonian

|- style="height:2em"
| colspan=3 | Vacant
| nowrap | Mar 7, 1825 –Dec 26, 1825
|
|- style="height:2em"
! 11
| align=left | John Randolph
|  | Jacksonian
| nowrap | Dec 26, 1825 –Mar 3, 1827
| Appointed to continue Barbour's term.Lost election to next term.

|- style="height:2em"
! rowspan=9 | 12
| rowspan=9 align=left | John Tyler
| rowspan=5  | Jacksonian
| rowspan=9 nowrap | Mar 4, 1827 –Feb 29, 1836
| rowspan=5 | Elected in 1827.
| rowspan=5 | 8
| 

|- style="height:2em"
| 
| rowspan=7 | 8
| rowspan=2 | Re-elected in 1829.Resigned.

|- style="height:2em"
| rowspan=3 

|- style="height:2em"
| 
| nowrap | Jul 16, 1832 –Dec 10, 1832
| colspan=3 | Vacant

|- style="height:2em"
| rowspan=2 | Elected to finish Tazewell's term.Resigned.
| rowspan=2 nowrap | Dec 10, 1832 –Feb 22, 1834
| rowspan=2  | Jacksonian
| rowspan=2 align=right | William C. Rives
! rowspan=2 | 12

|- style="height:2em"
| rowspan=4  | NationalRepublican
| rowspan=4 | Re-elected in 1833.Resigned.
| rowspan=10 | 9
| rowspan=3 

|- style="height:2em"
| 
| nowrap | Feb 22, 1834 –Feb 26, 1834
| colspan=3 | Vacant

|- style="height:2em"
| Elected to finish Rives's term.
| rowspan=4 nowrap | Feb 26, 1834 –Jul 4, 1836
| rowspan=4  | NationalRepublican
| rowspan=4 align=right | Benjamin W. Leigh
! rowspan=4 | 13

|- style="height:2em"
| rowspan=5 
| rowspan=9 | 9
| rowspan=3 | Re-elected in 1835.Resigned.

|- style="height:2em"
| colspan=3 | Vacant
| nowrap | Feb 29, 1836 –Mar 3, 1836
|
|- style="height:2em"
! rowspan=9 | 13
| rowspan=5 align=left | William C. Rives
| rowspan=3  | Jacksonian
| rowspan=5 nowrap | Mar 4, 1836 –Mar 3, 1839
| rowspan=5 | Elected to finish Tyler's term

|- style="height:2em"
| 
| nowrap | Jul 4, 1836 –Dec 12, 1836
| colspan=3 | Vacant

|- style="height:2em"
| rowspan=2 | Elected to finish Leigh's term.Resigned to become judge of the Virginia Supreme Court of Appeals.
| rowspan=2 nowrap | Dec 12, 1836 –Mar 13, 1837
|  | Jacksonian
| rowspan=2 align=right | Richard E. Parker
! rowspan=2 | 14

|- style="height:2em"
| rowspan=2  | Democratic
| rowspan=2 
|  | Democratic

|- style="height:2em"
| rowspan=3 | Elected to finish Parker's term.Lost re-election.
| rowspan=3 nowrap | Mar 14, 1837 –Mar 3, 1841
| rowspan=3  | Democratic
| rowspan=3 align=right | William H. Roane
! rowspan=3 | 15

|- style="height:2em"
| colspan=2 | Vacant
| nowrap | Mar 3, 1839 –Jan 18, 1841
| Legislature failed to elect.
| rowspan=4 | 10
| rowspan=2 

|- style="height:2em"
| rowspan=3 align=left | William C. Rives
| rowspan=3  | Whig
| rowspan=3 nowrap | Jan 18, 1841 –Mar 3, 1845
| rowspan=3 | Re-elected late in 1841.

|- style="height:2em"
| 
| rowspan=6 | 10
| rowspan=6 | Elected in 1840.Lost re-election.
| rowspan=6 nowrap | Mar 4, 1841 –Mar 3, 1847
| rowspan=6  | Whig
| rowspan=6 align=right | William S. Archer
! rowspan=6 | 16

|- style="height:2em"
| 

|- style="height:2em"
| colspan=3 | Vacant
| nowrap | Mar 4, 1845 –Dec 3, 1845
| 
| rowspan=6 | 11
| rowspan=4 

|- style="height:2em"
! 14
| align=left | Isaac S. Pennybacker
|  | Democratic
| nowrap | Dec 3, 1845 –Jan 12, 1847
| Elected to finish the vacant term.Died.

|- style="height:2em"
| colspan=3 | Vacant
| nowrap | Jan 12, 1847 –Jan 21, 1847
|
|- style="height:2em"
! rowspan=9 | 15
| rowspan=9 align=left | James M. Mason
| rowspan=9  | Democratic
| rowspan=9 nowrap | Jan 21, 1847 –Jul 11, 1861
| rowspan=3 | Elected to finish Pennybacker's term.

|- style="height:2em"
| 
| rowspan=3 | 11
| rowspan=3 | Elected in 1846.
| rowspan=8 nowrap | Mar 4, 1847 –Jul 11, 1861
| rowspan=8  | Democratic
| rowspan=8 align=right | Robert M. T. Hunter
! rowspan=8 | 17

|- style="height:2em"
| 

|- style="height:2em"
| rowspan=3 | Re-elected in 1850.
| rowspan=3 | 12
| 

|- style="height:2em"
| 
| rowspan=3 | 12
| rowspan=3 | Re-elected in 1852.

|- style="height:2em"
| 

|- style="height:2em"
| rowspan=3 | Re-elected in 1856.Expelled for his support of the Confederacy.
| rowspan=5 | 13
| 

|- style="height:2em"
| 
| rowspan=6 | 13
| rowspan=2 | Re-elected in 1858.Expelled for his support of the Confederacy.

|- style="height:2em"
| rowspan=3 

|- style="height:2em"
| colspan=3 | Vacant
| nowrap | Jul 11, 1861 –Jul 13, 1861
| 
| 
| nowrap | Jul 11, 1861 –Jul 13, 1861
| colspan=3 | Vacant

|- style="height:2em"
! 16
| align=left | Waitman T. Willey
|  | Unionist
| nowrap | Jul 13, 1861 –Mar 3, 1863
| Elected to finish Mason's term.Retired.
| rowspan=3 | Elected to finish Hunter's term.
| rowspan=3 nowrap | Jul 13, 1861 –Mar 3, 1865
| rowspan=3  | Unionist
| rowspan=3 align=right | John S. Carlile
! rowspan=3 | 18

|- style="height:2em"
! 17
| align=left | Lemuel J. Bowden
|  | Unionist
| nowrap | Mar 4, 1863 –Jan 2, 1864
| Elected in 1863.Died.
| rowspan=4 | 14
| rowspan=2 

|- style="height:2em"
| rowspan=4 colspan=3 | Vacant
| rowspan=4 nowrap | Jan 2, 1864 –Jan 26, 1870
| rowspan=4 | Joseph Segar (U) presented his credentials, but was not seated.Civil War and Reconstruction.

|- style="height:2em"
| 
| rowspan=4 | 14
| rowspan=3 | John Underwood (U) presented his credentials, but was not seated.Civil War and Reconstruction.
| rowspan=3 nowrap | Mar 4, 1865 –Jan 26, 1870
| rowspan=3 colspan=3 | Vacant

|- style="height:2em"
| 

|- style="height:2em"
| rowspan=5 | 15
| rowspan=2 

|- style="height:2em"
! rowspan=4 | 18
| rowspan=4 align=left | John F. Lewis
| rowspan=4  | Republican
| rowspan=4 nowrap | Jan 26, 1870 –Mar 3, 1875
| rowspan=4 |Elected to finish the vacant term.Retired.
| Elected to finish the vacant term.
| nowrap | Jan 26, 1870 –Mar 3, 1871
|  | Democratic
| align=right | John W. Johnston
! rowspan=8 | 19

|- style="height:2em"
| rowspan=2 
| rowspan=4 | 15
|
| Mar 4, 1871 –Mar 15, 1871
| rowspan=1 colspan=2 | Vacant

|- style="height:2em"
| rowspan=3 | Re-elected late in 1871.
| rowspan=6 | Mar 15, 1871 –Mar 3, 1883
| rowspan=6  | Democratic
| rowspan=6 align=right | John W. Johnston

|- style="height:2em"
| 

|- style="height:2em"
! rowspan=3 | 19
| rowspan=3 align=left | Robert E. Withers
| rowspan=3  | Democratic
| rowspan=3 nowrap | Mar 4, 1875 –Mar 3, 1881
| rowspan=3 | Elected in 1875.Lost re-election.
| rowspan=3 | 16
| 

|- style="height:2em"
| 
| rowspan=3 | 16
| rowspan=3 | Re-elected in 1877.Lost re-election.

|- style="height:2em"
| 

|- style="height:2em"
! rowspan=3 | 20
| rowspan=3 align=left | William Mahone
| rowspan=3  | Readjuster
| rowspan=3 nowrap | Mar 4, 1881 –Mar 3, 1887
| rowspan=3 | Elected in 1881.Lost re-election.
| rowspan=3 | 17
| 

|- style="height:2em"
| 
| rowspan=3 | 17
| rowspan=3 | Elected early in 1881.Retired.
| rowspan=3 nowrap | Mar 4, 1883 –Mar 3, 1889
| rowspan=3  | Readjuster
| rowspan=3 align=right | Harrison H. Riddleberger
! rowspan=3 | 20

|- style="height:2em"
| 

|- style="height:2em"
! rowspan=14 | 21
| rowspan=14 align=left | John W. Daniel
| rowspan=14  | Democratic
| rowspan=14 nowrap | Mar 4, 1887 –Jun 29, 1910
| rowspan=5 | Elected in 1887.
| rowspan=5 | 18
| 

|- style="height:2em"
| 
| rowspan=5 | 18
| rowspan=2 | Elected early in 1887.Died.
| rowspan=2 nowrap | Mar 4, 1889 –May 14, 1892
| rowspan=2  | Democratic
| rowspan=2 align=right |  John S. Barbour Jr.
! rowspan=2 | 21

|- style="height:2em"
| rowspan=3 

|- style="height:2em"
| 
| nowrap | May 14, 1892 –May 28, 1892
| colspan=3 | Vacant

|- style="height:2em"
| rowspan=2 | Appointed to continue Barbour's term.Elected in 1893 to finish Barbour's term.Retired.
| rowspan=2 nowrap | May 28, 1892 –Mar 3, 1895
| rowspan=2  | Democratic
| rowspan=2 align=right | Eppa Hunton
! rowspan=2 | 22

|- style="height:2em"
| rowspan=3 | Re-elected early in 1891.
| rowspan=3 | 19
| 

|- style="height:2em"
| 
| rowspan=3 | 19
| rowspan=3 | Elected early in 1893.
| rowspan=15 nowrap | Mar 4, 1895 –Nov 12, 1919
| rowspan=15  | Democratic
| rowspan=15 align=right | Thomas S. Martin
! rowspan=15 | 23

|- style="height:2em"
| 

|- style="height:2em"
| rowspan=3 | Re-elected in 1899.
| rowspan=3 | 20
| 

|- style="height:2em"
| 
| rowspan=3 | 20
| rowspan=3 | Re-elected early in 1899.

|- style="height:2em"
| 

|- style="height:2em"
| rowspan=3 | Re-elected in 1904.Re-elected in 1910, but died.
| rowspan=5 | 21
| 

|- style="height:2em"
| 
| rowspan=5 | 21
| rowspan=5 | Re-elected in 1906.

|- style="height:2em"
| rowspan=3 

|- style="height:2em"
| colspan=3 | Vacant
| nowrap | Jun 29, 1910 –Aug 1, 1910
| Vacant

|- style="height:2em"
! rowspan=14 | 22
| rowspan=14 align=left | Claude A. Swanson
| rowspan=14  | Democratic
| rowspan=14 nowrap | Aug 1, 1910 –Mar 3, 1933
| Appointed to finish Daniel's last term.

|- style="height:2em"
| rowspan=3 | Re-appointed to begin Daniel's next term.Elected in 1912 to finish Daniel's next term.
| rowspan=3 | 22
| 

|- style="height:2em"
| 
| rowspan=3 | 22
| rowspan=3 | Re-elected in 1912.

|- style="height:2em"
| 

|- style="height:2em"
| rowspan=5 | Re-elected in 1916.
| rowspan=5 | 23
| 

|- style="height:2em"
| rowspan=3 
| rowspan=5 | 23
| Re-elected in 1918.Died.

|- style="height:2em"
| 
| nowrap | Nov 12, 1919 –Feb 2, 1920
| colspan=3 | Vacant

|- style="height:2em"
| rowspan=3 | Appointed Nov 18, 1919 to continue Martin's term, but remained U.S. Secretary of the Treasury.Elected in 1920 to finish Martin's term.
| rowspan=14 nowrap | Feb 2, 1920 –May 28, 1946
| rowspan=14  | Democratic
| rowspan=14 align=right | Carter Glass
! rowspan=14 | 24

|- style="height:2em"
| 

|- style="height:2em"
| rowspan=3 | Re-elected in 1922.
| rowspan=3 | 24
| 

|- style="height:2em"
| 
| rowspan=3 | 24
| rowspan=3 | Re-elected in 1924.

|- style="height:2em"
| 

|- style="height:2em"
| rowspan=2 | Re-elected in 1928.Resigned to become U.S. Secretary of the Navy.
| rowspan=3 | 25
| 

|- style="height:2em"
| 
| rowspan=3 | 25
| rowspan=3 | Re-elected in 1930.

|- style="height:2em"
! rowspan=20 | 23
| rowspan=20 align=left | Harry F. Byrd
| rowspan=20  | Democratic
| rowspan=20 nowrap | Mar 4, 1933 –Nov 10, 1965
| Appointed to continue Swanson's term.Elected in 1933 to finish Swanson's term.
| 

|- style="height:2em"
| rowspan=3 | Re-elected in 1934.
| rowspan=3 | 26
| 

|- style="height:2em"
| 
| rowspan=3 | 26
| rowspan=3 | Re-elected in 1936.

|- style="height:2em"
| 

|- style="height:2em"
| rowspan=6 | Re-elected in 1940.
| rowspan=6 | 27
| 

|- style="height:2em"
| 
| rowspan=6 | 27
| rowspan=2 | Re-elected in 1942.Died.

|- style="height:2em"
| rowspan=4 

|- style="height:2em"
| 
| nowrap | May 28, 1946 –May 31, 1946
| colspan=3 | Vacant

|- style="height:2em"
| Appointed to continue Glass's term.Retired.
| nowrap | May 31, 1946 –Nov 5, 1946
|  | Democratic
| align=right | Thomas G. Burch
! 25

|- style="height:2em"
| rowspan=2 | Elected to finish Glass's term.
| rowspan=13 nowrap | Nov 5, 1946 –Dec 30, 1966
| rowspan=13  | Democratic
| rowspan=13 align=right | A. Willis Robertson
! rowspan=13 | 26

|- style="height:2em"
| rowspan=3 | Re-elected in 1946.
| rowspan=3 | 28
| 

|- style="height:2em"
| 
| rowspan=3 | 28
| rowspan=3 | Re-elected in 1948.

|- style="height:2em"
| 

|- style="height:2em"
| rowspan=3 | Re-elected in 1952.
| rowspan=3 | 29
| 

|- style="height:2em"
| 
| rowspan=3 | 29
| rowspan=3 | Re-elected in 1954.

|- style="height:2em"
| 

|- style="height:2em"
| rowspan=3 | Re-elected in 1958.
| rowspan=3 | 30
| 

|- style="height:2em"
| 
| rowspan=6 | 30
| rowspan=5 | Re-elected in 1960.Lost re-nomination, retired early to give his successor preferential seniority.

|- style="height:2em"
| 

|- style="height:2em"
| Re-elected in 1964.Resigned for health reasons.
| rowspan=6 | 31
| rowspan=4 

|- style="height:2em"
| colspan=3 | Vacant
| nowrap | Nov 10, 1965 –Nov 12, 1965
|
|- style="height:2em"
! rowspan=11 | 24
| rowspan=11 align=left | Harry F. Byrd Jr.
| rowspan=4  | Democratic
| rowspan=11 nowrap | Nov 12, 1965 –Jan 3, 1983
| rowspan=4 | Appointed to continue his father's term.Elected in 1966 to finish his father's term.

|- style="height:2em"
| Appointed to finish Robertson's term, having already been elected to the next term.
| rowspan=4 nowrap | Dec 31, 1966 –Jan 3, 1973
| rowspan=4  | Democratic
| rowspan=4 align=right | William Spong Jr.
! rowspan=4 | 27

|- style="height:2em"
| 
| rowspan=3 | 31
| rowspan=3 | Elected in 1966.Lost re-election.

|- style="height:2em"
| 

|- style="height:2em"
| rowspan=7  | Independent
| rowspan=3 | Re-elected in 1970 as an Independent.
| rowspan=3 | 32
| 

|- style="height:2em"
| 
| rowspan=4 | 32
| rowspan=3 | Elected in 1972.Retired and resigned early to give his successor preferential seniority.
| rowspan=3 nowrap | Jan 3, 1973 –Jan 1, 1979
| rowspan=3  | Republican
| rowspan=3 align=right | William L. Scott
! rowspan=3 | 28

|- style="height:2em"
| 

|- style="height:2em"
| rowspan=4 | Re-elected in 1976.Retired.
| rowspan=4 | 33
| rowspan=2 

|- style="height:2em"
| Appointed to finish Scott's term, having already been elected to the next term.
| rowspan=16 nowrap | Jan 2, 1979 –Jan 3, 2009
| rowspan=16  | Republican
| rowspan=16 align=right | John Warner
! rowspan=16 | 29

|- style="height:2em"
| 
| rowspan=3 | 33
| rowspan=3 | Elected in 1978.

|- style="height:2em"
| 

|- style="height:2em"
! rowspan=3 | 25
| rowspan=3 align=left | Paul Trible
| rowspan=3  | Republican
| rowspan=3 nowrap | Jan 3, 1983 –Jan 3, 1989
| rowspan=3 | Elected in 1982.Retired.
| rowspan=3 | 34
| 

|- style="height:2em"
| 
| rowspan=3 | 34
| rowspan=3 | Re-elected in 1984.

|- style="height:2em"
| 

|- style="height:2em"
! rowspan=6 | 26
| rowspan=6 align=left | Chuck Robb
| rowspan=6  | Democratic
| rowspan=6 nowrap | Jan 3, 1989 –Jan 3, 2001
| rowspan=3 | Elected in 1988.
| rowspan=3 | 35
| 

|- style="height:2em"
| 
| rowspan=3 | 35
| rowspan=3 | Re-elected in 1990.

|- style="height:2em"
| 

|- style="height:2em"
| rowspan=3 | Re-elected in 1994.Lost re-election.
| rowspan=3 | 36
| 

|- style="height:2em"
| 
| rowspan=3 | 36
| rowspan=3 | Re-elected in 1996.

|- style="height:2em"
| 

|- style="height:2em"
! rowspan=3 | 27
| rowspan=3 align=left | George Allen
| rowspan=3  | Republican
| rowspan=3 nowrap | Jan 3, 2001 –Jan 3, 2007
| rowspan=3 | Elected in 2000.Lost re-election.
| rowspan=3 | 37
| 

|- style="height:2em"
| 
| rowspan=3 | 37
| rowspan=3 | Re-elected in 2002.Retired.

|- style="height:2em"
| 

|- style="height:2em"
! rowspan=3 | 28
| rowspan=3 align=left | Jim Webb
| rowspan=3  | Democratic
| rowspan=3 nowrap | Jan 3, 2007 –Jan 3, 2013
| rowspan=3 | Elected in 2006.Retired.
| rowspan=3 | 38
| 

|- style="height:2em"
| 
| rowspan=3 | 38
| rowspan=3 | Elected in 2008.
| rowspan=9 nowrap | Jan 3, 2009 –Present
| rowspan=9  | Democratic
| rowspan=9 align=right | Mark Warner
! rowspan=9 | 30

|- style="height:2em"
| 

|- style="height:2em"
! rowspan=6 | 29
| rowspan=6 align=left | Tim Kaine
| rowspan=6  | Democratic
| rowspan=6 nowrap | Jan 3, 2013 –Present
| rowspan=3 | Elected in 2012.
| rowspan=3 | 39
| 

|- style="height:2em"
| 
| rowspan=3 | 39
| rowspan=3 | Re-elected in 2014.

|- style="height:2em"
| 

|- style="height:2em"
| rowspan=3 | Re-elected in 2018.
| rowspan=3 | 40
| 

|- style="height:2em"
| 
| rowspan=3 | 40
| rowspan=3  | Re-elected in 2020.

|- style="height:2em"
| 

|- style="height:2em"
| rowspan=2 colspan=5 | To be determined in the 2024 election.
| rowspan=2 |41
| 

|- style="height:2em"
| 
| 41
| colspan=5 | To be determined in the 2026 election.

See also

 United States congressional delegations from Virginia
 List of United States representatives from Virginia
 Elections in Virginia

References 

 

 
United States Senators
Virginia